Association Sportive Arue, is a football club from Arue, Tahiti. It currently competes in the Tahiti Ligue 1, after being promoted from the Tahiti Ligue 2 in the 2019–20 season.

Last seasons

Current squad
Squad for the 2020–21 Tahiti Ligue 1

Staff

Achievements
Tahiti Ligue 1
Champions (1): 1980

Tahiti Cup
Champions (1): 1970

References

Football clubs in Tahiti
Football clubs in French Polynesia